Reginald John Grabowski (July 16, 1907 – April 2, 1955) was a pitcher in Major League Baseball. He played for the Philadelphia Phillies.

References

External links

1907 births
1955 deaths
Major League Baseball pitchers
Philadelphia Phillies players
Baseball players from Syracuse, New York